Monroe Jackson Rathbone II (March 1, 1900 – August 2, 1976) was an American businessman who was the chairman, president, and CEO of Standard Oil of New Jersey (now the Exxon Corporation).

Early life and education
Rathbone was born in Parkersburg, West Virginia, the son of Ida Virginia (née Welch) and Monroe Jackson Rathbone. Rathbone received a Bachelor of Science in chemical engineering from Lehigh University in 1921.

Business career
Rathbone joined Standard Oil of New Jersey in 1921 as a design engineer at the Baton Rouge refinery of Standard Oil of Louisiana. In 1923, he was promoted to the operations division of Louisiana Standard as an experimental engineer. In 1924, he was named assistant to the general superintendent. In 1926, he became general superintendent, then assistant general manager and vice president. In 1944, he was appointed president and director of Standard 's new Esso Division. In 1949, he was named to the board of directors of the parent Standard Oil Company. In 1953, Rathbone was named president of Standard Oil of New Jersey, and in 1959 he was named CEO. In 1962, he was elected chairman of the board of directors of Standard Oil of New Jersey. He retired in 1965.

He served on the boards of directors for many other major corporations, including Bethlehem Steel, American Telephone and Telegraph, and Prudential Insurance, and on such private groups as the Deafness Research Foundation, the National Fund for Medical Education, and the Council for Financial Aid to Education.
He was active in the Lehigh Alumni Association, serving as board chairman and president; was board chairman of the American Petroleum Institute and a director of Junior Achievement. During World War II, he served on President Roosevelt's Business Council.

Personal life
Rathbone was married in 1922 to Eleanor Groves, and had two children - Virginia and Dr. Monroe Jackson Rathbone III. Jackson Rathbone is Rathbone's great-grandson.

A resident of Summit, New Jersey, Rathbone maintained a country home near Baton Rouge, Louisiana.

Rathbone died at the age of 76 on August 2, 1976, at Baton Rouge General Hospital.

References

External links

1900 births
1976 deaths
American chairpersons of corporations
American chemical engineers
American chief executives of Fortune 500 companies
Directors of ExxonMobil
ExxonMobil people
Bethlehem Steel people
Lehigh University alumni
People from Parkersburg, West Virginia
People from Summit, New Jersey